"Back to Back" is a song by Canadian rapper Drake. It is the second diss track created by Drake and aimed at American rapper Meek Mill, following "Charged Up". At OVO Fest 2015, Drake performed "Charged Up" and this song live. The album's cover art is a still of game 6 of the 1993 World Series, when former professional baseball player Joe Carter of the Toronto Blue Jays famously hit a walk-off home run to win the series against the Philadelphia Phillies. The Blue Jays repeated as World Series champions, becoming the first MLB franchise founded after 1903, and 7th overall, to win back-to-back titles. 

A different version of the song with humorous lyrics was used in the Saturday Night Live skit "Drake's Beef", in the May 14, 2016 show (Season 41, Episode 20), which Drake performed on and hosted.

The song saw critical and commercial success, peaking at number 21 on the US Billboard Hot 100 and being nominated for Best Rap Performance at the 58th Grammy Awards.

Background and release
On July 22, 2015, Meek Mill publicly criticized Drake on Twitter after being upset with the latter's non-involvement with the promotion of his album Dreams Worth More Than Money, claiming that Drake had used ghostwriters to write his verse on "R.I.C.O.", and then releasing the reference track to the song. Following this, Drake released two diss songs within a week, "Charged Up" and "Back to Back", both aimed at Meek Mill. The song's title references the Toronto Blue Jays', Drake’s hometown team, winning back-to-back World Series championships in 1992 and 1993. They won their second consecutive championship by defeating the Philadelphia Phillies, Meek Mill’s hometown team, in the 1993 World Series. Joe Carter, who hit the walk-off home run that ended the series, is depicted on the single's cover. The song was released on July 29, 2015, the same day that the Blue Jays and Phillies played against each other. It also is a reference to the Back-to-Back release of diss tracks. Meek Mill later responded with another diss song about Drake, titled "Wanna Know". Meek Mill later removed his diss to Drake on SoundCloud.

Commercial performance
"Back to Back" debuted and peaked at number 27 on the Billboard Canadian Hot 100. The song also debuted and peaked at number 21 on the Billboard Hot 100, with its chart entrance fueled by 122,000 first-week digital download sales and 4.5 million streams. As of September 2015, "Back to Back" has sold 253,000 copies in the United States.

Personnel 
All are credited as songwriters. Adapted from TIDAL and comments to Genius.

 Daxz – producer
 Drake – co-producer, vocals
 40 – co-producer
 Nav – additional production

Charts

Weekly charts

Year-end charts

Certifications and sales

References
  
        

2015 songs
Drake (musician) songs
Songs written by Drake (musician)
Diss tracks
2015 singles
Song recordings produced by 40 (record producer)
Song recordings produced by Nav (rapper)
Songs written by Nav (rapper)
Songs written by 40 (record producer)